The Journal of Biomolecular NMR publishes research on technical developments and innovative applications of nuclear magnetic resonance spectroscopy for the study of structure and dynamic properties of biopolymers in solution, liquid crystals, solids and mixed environments. Some of the main topics include experimental and computational approaches for the determination of three-dimensional structures of proteins and nucleic acids, advancements in the automated analysis of NMR spectra, and new methods to probe and interpret molecular motions.

The journal was founded in 1991 by Kurt Wüthrich, who later received a Nobel prize in Chemistry in 2002 for his seminal contributions to the field of NMR. Now, the current editor-in-chief is Gerhard Wagner (Harvard Medical School).

According to the Journal Citation Reports, the journal has a 2020 impact factor of 2.835.

Associate Editors 
Accompanying Gerhard Wagner (editor-in-chief), the Associate Editors of the Journal of Biomolecular NMR are:

 Ad Bax (NIH, USA)
 Martin Billeter (Göteborg University, Sweden)
 Lewis E. Kay (University of Toronto, Canada)
 Rob Kaptein (Utrecht University, The Netherlands)
 Gottfried Otting (Australian National University, Australia)
 Arthur G. Palmer (Columbia University, USA)
 Tatyana Polenova (University of Delaware, USA), and
 Bernd Reif (TU Munich, Germany)

Most cited articles 
According to the Web of Science, as of August 2018, there are seven Journal of Biomolecular NMR articles with over 1,500 citations:
  – cited 9,252 times.
  – cited 3,527 times.
  – cited 3,199 times.
  – cited 2,540 times.
  – cited 2,288 times.
  – cited 1,781 times.
  – cited 1,723 times.

References

External links 
 

Biochemistry journals
Physics journals
Springer Science+Business Media academic journals
English-language journals
Publications established in 1991
Monthly journals